Kieran Kane (born October 7, 1949) is an American country music artist, as well as the owner of Dead Reckoning Records, an independent record label. Between 1986 and 1990, he and Jamie O'Hara comprised The O'Kanes, a duo which charted seven singles on the U.S. Billboard Hot Country Singles charts, including the Number One single "Can't Stop My Heart from Loving You". In addition, Kieran charted a string of solo singles on Asylum Records in 1982. After The O'Kanes disbanded in 1990, both O'Hara and Kane recorded solo albums of their own. Kane was also responsible for writing the song "I'll Go On Loving You" which was a top 5 hit for Alan Jackson in 1998.

Biography
Kane was born in Queens, New York. His first musical experience was at age nine, playing drums in his brother's rock band. Eventually, Kane shifted his focus to bluegrass, before relocating to Los Angeles, California where he found work as a session guitarist and songwriter.

Kieran moved to Nashville, Tennessee by the 1980s, eventually signing to a publishing contract. He was also signed to a recording contract with Asylum Records, releasing his self-titled album in 1982. This album included two Top 20 country hits.

The O'Kanes

Jamie O'Hara, another songwriter who worked for the same publishing company, first collaborated with Kane on a song entitled "Bluegrass Blues", eventually recorded by The Judds. Afterwards, the two began writing more songs together, and by 1986, they decided to form a duo known as The O'Kanes.

Signed to Columbia Records in 1986, The O'Kanes recorded three studio albums for the label, in addition to charting seven singles on the Billboard Hot Country Singles charts. Their third album failed to produce any singles, however, and by 1990, the duo parted ways.

Return to solo career
In 1993, Kieran returned to his career as a solo performer. He signed to Atlantic Records that year, releasing the album Find My Way Home. Due to poor sales of this album, he was soon dropped from Atlantic's roster. Two years later, Kane, along with three other Nashville singer-songwriters, founded Dead Reckoning Records, an independent record label specializing in country music. The label's first release was his second studio album, titled Dead Rekoning.

Discography

Albums

Singles

Music videos

References

External links
Dead Reckoning Records official website

1949 births
American country singer-songwriters
Living people
Musicians from New York City
The O'Kanes members
Elektra Records artists
Atlantic Records artists
Singer-songwriters from New York (state)
Country musicians from New York (state)